Krzysztof Szydłowiecki (1467–1532) was a Polish noble (szlachcic), magnate, and Count of Szydłowiec.

He was courtier since 1496, Podstoli of Kraków, Treasurer and Marshal of the Court of Prince Zygmunt since 1505, Podkomorzy of Kraków and Court Treasurer of the Crown from 1507 to 1510, castellan of Sandomierz since 1509, Deputy Chancellor of the Crown since 1511, Great Chancellor of the Crown and voivode of Kraków Voivodeship from 1515 to 1527 and castellan of Kraków since 1527. Szydłowiecki was also the Starost of Sieradz, Gostynin, Sochaczew, Nowokrocze, and Łuków.

He is one of the characters on the famous painting by Jan Matejko, Prussian Homage.

Gallery

Bibliography
 Kieszkowski, Jerzy: Kanclerz Krzysztof Szydłowiecki. Z dziejów kultury i sztuki zygmuntowskich czasów, Poznań 1912.
 Wijaczka, Jacek: Kanclerz wielki koronny Krzysztof Szydłowiecki a książę Albrecht pruski, [w:] Hrabstwo szydłowieckie Radziwiłłów. Materiały sesji popularnonaukowej 19 lutego 1994 r., red. Zenon Guldon, Szydłowiec: Burmistrz m. Szydłowca, MLIM, SRS; 1994, s. 23-38. [b. nr ISBN].
 Słownik biograficzny historii powszechnej do XVII stulecia, red. Kazimierz Lepszy, Warszawa: WP, 1968.

1467 births
1532 deaths
Castellans of Kraków
Krzysztof
People from Szydłowiec County
15th-century Polish nobility
Secular senators of the Polish–Lithuanian Commonwealth
Starost of Leżajsk
People from Szydłowiec
Polish patrons of the arts
16th-century Polish nobility
Crown Vice-Chancellors